SOAS or Soas or variation, may refer to:

 427 Special Operations Aviation Squadron, Canadian Special Operations Forces Command, Royal Canadian Air Force, Canadian Armed Forces, Canada
 Oracle SOA Suite, a middleware product for service-oriented architecture from Oracle
SEAL Officer Assessment and Selection
University of London:
 School of Oriental and African Studies (est. 1916; the School of Oriental and African Studies), University of London, London, England, UK
 SOAS School of Law
 School of Advanced Study (est. 1994), University of London, London, England, UK

See also

 SoaS Fedora, a respin of Fedora Linux
 School of Advanced Studies (est. 2017), University of Tyumen, Tyumen, Siberia, Russia
 Psoas muscle (soas), a long fusiform muscle located in the lateral lumbar region
 
 SOA (disambiguation)